Bertogne is a municipality of Wallonia located in the province of Luxembourg, Belgium. 

On 1 January 2007 the municipality, which covers 91.67 km², had 3,002 inhabitants, giving a population density of 32.7 inhabitants per km².

The municipality consists of the following districts: Bertogne, Flamierge, and Longchamps. 

Other population centers include:

See also
 List of protected heritage sites in Bertogne

References

External links
 

 
Municipalities of Luxembourg (Belgium)